Gude is an Afro-Asiatic language spoken in Nigeria in Adamawa State in Mubi LGA and in Borno State in Askira-Uba LGA.  It is also spoken in neighboring Cameroon.  Different dialects are spoken in Nigeria and Cameroon.

Gude is spoken in the southern part of Bourrha commune (Mayo-Tsanaga department, Far North Region) and the western end of Mayo-Oulo district (Mayo-Louti department, North Region). It is spoken by about 28,000 people.

Notes

References
 J.T. Hoskison.  1983.  "A Grammar and Dictionary of the Gude Language," Ohio State University PhD dissertation.
 René Canac Marquis. 1987. Word orders in Gude and the VSO Parameter. in Frajzyngier, Zygmunt, Current progress in Chadic linguistics. Amsterdam: John Benjamins.

Biu-Mandara languages
Languages of Nigeria
Languages of Cameroon